Fjordgård or Fjordgard is a small fishing village in Senja Municipality in Troms og Finnmark county, Norway. It is located on the northern part of the island of Senja, the second largest island in Norway. Fjordgård lies on the west side of the fjord Ørnfjorden, which is an arm that branches off of the main Øyfjorden.

Fjordgård is surrounded by high and steep mountains and is connected to the rest of the island of Senja by a series of three road tunnels. Its population (2001) is 213.  Fjordgård Chapel is located in the village.

Cultural references
In Book 4 of Karl Ove Knausgård's internationally popular My Struggle novels, Karl Ove teaches at the local school in Fjordgård. The village is referred to in the book by the pseudonym "Håfjord."

References

Villages in Troms
Populated places of Arctic Norway
Senja